ATP-sensitive inward rectifier potassium channel 10 is a protein that in humans is encoded by the KCNJ10 gene.

Function 

This gene encodes a member of the inward rectifier-type potassium channel family, Kir4.1, characterized by having a greater tendency to allow potassium to flow into, rather than out of, a cell. Kir4.1, may form a heterodimer with another potassium channel protein and may be responsible for the potassium buffering action of glial cells in the brain. Mutations in this gene have been associated with seizure susceptibility of common idiopathic generalized epilepsy syndromes.

EAST syndrome
Humans with mutations in the KCNJ10 gene that cause loss of function in related K+ channels can display Epilepsy, Ataxia, Sensorineural deafness and Tubulopathy, the EAST syndrome (Gitelman syndrome phenotype) reflecting roles for KCNJ10 gene products in the brain, inner ear and kidney. The Kir4.1 channel is expressed in the Stria vascularis and is essential for formation of the endolymph, the fluid that surrounds the mechanosensitive stereocilia of the sensory hair cells that make hearing possible.

Rett Syndrome 
Rett syndrome is a neurological disorder characterized by a mutation in the MeCP2 gene. This mutation results in less MeCP2. KCNJ10 expression is upregulated by the transcription factor MeCP2. MeCP2 deficiency leads to less Kir4.1 channels present on astrocytes in the brain. Since there are fewer channels allowing potassium into the cells, extracellular potassium levels are higher. Higher extracellular potassium leaves neurons more easily excitable which could contribute to the epilepsy observed in many Rett Syndrome patients.

Interactions 

KCNJ10 has been shown to interact with Interleukin 16.

See also 
 Inward-rectifier potassium ion channel

References

Further reading

External links 
  GeneReviews/NCBI/NIH/UW entry on Pendred Syndrome/DFNB4
 

Ion channels